Penelope Scott is an American musician, singer-songwriter, and producer. She has produced all of her own music. After releasing the compilation albums Junkyard (2020) and The Junkyard 2 (2020), Scott released her debut album, Public Void, in August 2020. Her song "Rät" peaked at 29 on Billboards Hot Rock & Alternative Songs Chart. Scott's latest EP Hazards released in 2021.

Background

Early life and career
Scott began learning the piano at the age of eight. In middle and high school, she focused on writing lyrics and learning how to record. Scott began publishing her songs online while taking a music production class in college. She released the compilation album Junkyard on February 27, 2020, followed shortly by the release of The Junkyard 2 on May 13, 2020. The latter explores themes of emotional labor, healthcare and insecurity. A song from the second album, "Sweet Hibiscus Tea", went viral that same month. Scott later expressed surprise at the success of The Junkyard 2 given its lack of mixing. Her college courses aided in her mixing skills, though she also took courses in philosophy and computer science.

2020-present: Public Void and Hazards EP
Scott's debut album, Public Void, was released on Bandcamp on August 29, 2020, then on streaming services on September 25, 2020. In late 2020, her music found a larger audience on the short-form video-sharing app TikTok. A song off the album, "Rät," went viral in November 2020. The song expresses disappointment with Silicon Valley and technology billionaires, particularly Elon Musk. "Rät" peaked at 29 on Billboards Hot Rock & Alternative Songs Chart. Music producer Jesse Cannon described its lyrics as "so extremely online". Tens of thousands of TikTok videos incorporate the song. 

On November 4, 2020, Scott released the single "Born2Run", which went viral prior to its official release. The song garnered attention after the 2021 storming of the United States Capitol, due to its lyrics describing a fictional storming of the Capitol by politically involved youth. On April 30, 2021, Scott was featured on the song "Brittle, Baby!" by Char Chris. She also appeared in its music video as an animated version of herself.

In July 2021, Scott released the song "7 O'Clock" and announced an EP titled Hazards, which released on August 27, 2021, through Many Hats Distribution. She released the song "Dead Girls" as a single a day before the release of the EP. In July 2021, Scott announced her first tour to support Hazards, beginning on the west coast of the United States in December 2021. Scott also announced east coast tour dates for January 2022, but these were cancelled due to concerns about rising numbers of COVID-19 cases. In December 2021, Scott covered Carrie Underwood's "Before He Cheats" for an episode of the Recording Academy's ReImagined. 

In May 2022, Scott played at the Belltown Bloom music festival in Seattle. In June 2022, Scott began another US headlining tour supported by Rosie Tucker, fanclubwallet, and Yot Club. She then embarked on a UK/EU tour in July supported by Addison Grace. In October 2022, Scott was featured on the song "Baby Take My Acid" by Cincinnati-based artist Lincoln, which appeared on his debut album Everything is Wrong.

Recognition
In November 2020, she appeared on Rolling Stones Breakthrough 25, which showcases artists with large gains in streaming numbers—Scott was fifth, with 5.4million streams that week. Her song "Rät" appeared in the Top 40 of Billboards Hot Rock & Alternative Songs. Billboards Danielle Chelosky said about her music, "Sonically, it's like being inside of a videogame; lyrically, it's like scrolling a Tumblr meme page of an edgy teenage girl."

She has been described as an example of TikTok allowing for music artists to be successful without signing to a label; she reached 3million monthly listeners on Spotify without substantial media coverage. By March 2021, her music had been streamed an estimated 88million times in the United States, and her Youtube channel boasts over 100 million views as of February 2023.

Musical style and influences
Her music has been described as "baroque punk". Danielle Chelosky of Billboard said that her music features aspects of hyperpop. Scott said that she has "been waiting for anyone to come up with an accurate description" of her genre of music.

Discography

Albums

Studio albums

Compilation albums

Extended plays

Singles

References 

American women singer-songwriters
Living people
American TikTokers
Chiptune musicians
Indie folk musicians
American singer-songwriters
21st-century American singers
21st-century American women singers
2000 births